Kindoki is thought by its believers to be a kind of witchcraft or possession by evil spirits. In the Democratic Republic of the Congo and among Congolese immigrants in Europe, this belief is responsible for acts of child abandonment and ritual abuse of adults and children who were thought to have fallen victim to kindoki.

Children who are perceived to be possessed by kindoki are subjected to exorcisms that include beatings, starvation, and submersion in water.

Some so-called Christian preachers have acted as consultants, by pointing out supposedly possessed children and carrying out "exorcisms".

See also 
Witchcraft accusations against children in Africa

References

Society of the Democratic Republic of the Congo
African witchcraft